Djigoue is a town in southwestern Burkina Faso.

References

Populated places in the Sud-Ouest Region (Burkina Faso)